Achahoish is a village on the west coast of Knapdale in the Scottish council area of Argyll and Bute.  In 1882, Wilson's The Gazetter of Scotland described Achahoish as a "...hamlet at the head of Loch Killisport.  It has a post office...".

Achahoish recently benefited from the government's PPP funding and received a new primary school with two classrooms catering for the 20 local children from the small villages and hamlets in the area.  The school opened in the summer of 2005.

References

Villages in Knapdale